George Henry Pritchard (10 February 1861 – 7 July 1930) was a dual code footballer, who captained Queensland in Australian rules football and rugby union, one of just seven players to represent the Queensland in both codes. Pritchard served as captain for both Queensland and the Brisbane Football Club.

Early life
Pritchard was born in Albury, New South Wales moving with his parents to Brisbane age of 3 where his father became a trustee at Brisbane Grammar School the school at which George would attend.

Sport
Known by the name of Harry, Pritchard joined the Brisbane Football Club in 1876, becoming the club's captain in 1881. He was consistently named the most prodigious kick in the colony. He represented Queensland in New South Wales in 1882, captaining the side. He also served as the club's vice-president. He continued as an Australian rules footballer until his retirement from the game in 1884 before switching to rugby when that sport became more popular, joining the rugby team on tour to New South Wales captaining the side in 1884.

Outside of sport
Outside of football Pritchard was prominent in the sugar industry, moving to Townsville, and was active in politics where he was president of the National Political Council and served in the army for 9 years.

He died at Bowen Terrace, Brisbane in 1930.

References

1861 births
1930 deaths
Rugby union players from Queensland
Australian rules footballers from Queensland
People educated at Brisbane Grammar School
Sportspeople from Brisbane